Zacorus is a genus of moths belonging to the family Oecophoridae.

The species of this genus are found in Australia.

Species:
 Zacorus anomodes
 Zacorus carus

References

Oecophoridae
Moth genera